Pirozhkovo is a rural locality (a village) in Zaboryinskoye Rural Settlement, Beryozovsky District, Perm Krai, Russia. The population was 48 as of 2010.

Geography 
Pirozhkovo is located 3 km southwest of  Beryozovka (the district's administrative centre) by road. Shumkovo is the nearest rural locality.

References 

Rural localities in Beryozovsky District, Perm Krai